The Violin Concerto No. 1 in A minor, Op.28 by Karl Goldmark was composed in 1877 and premiered in Bremen the same year.  Goldmark later composed a second violin concerto, but it was never published, and is believed to be lost.

Structure and analysis
The concerto consists of three movements:

A standard performance lasts approximately 32 minutes.

A very romantic work, it has a Magyar march in the first movement and passages reminiscent of Dvořák and Mendelssohn in the second and third movements. It has started to re-enter the repertoire, through recordings by such prominent violin soloists as Itzhak Perlman and Joshua Bell. Nathan Milstein also championed the work and Milstein's recording of the Concerto (1957) is widely considered the definitive one.

Recordings 

Recordings of this concerto include:

References 
Notes

Sources

External links 
 
 
 

Goldmark
1877 compositions
Compositions by Karl Goldmark
Compositions in A minor